The 2014–15 Croatian Football Cup was the twenty-fourth season of Croatia's football knockout competition. The defending champions are Rijeka, having won their third title the previous year by defeating Dinamo Zagreb in the final.

Calendar

Preliminary round
The draw for the preliminary round was held on 11 August 2014 with matches scheduled on 27 August 2014.

* Match played on 26 August.

** Match played on 3 September.

First round
First round proper will consist of 16 single-legged matches, with 16 winners of the preliminary round joined by 16 clubs with the highest cup coefficients. Matches are scheduled for 24 September 2014.

* Match played on 23 September.

** Match played on 15 October.

Second round
The second round was contested on 29 October 2014 by 16 winners from the first round in eight single-legged fixtures.

* Match played on 28 October.

Quarter-finals
Quarter-final ties will be played over two legs, scheduled for 11 February and 4 March 2015. The round featured eight winners from the second round. The unseeded draw for quarter-final pairings was held on 4 November.

|}

Semi-finals
Semi-final ties will be played over two legs and are scheduled for 8 and 22 April 2015. The round featured four winners from the quarter-final. The unseeded draw for semi-final pairings was held on 6 March.

First legs

Second legs

Split won 2–1 on aggregate.

Dinamo Zagreb won 2–1 on aggregate.

Final

The final was played over one leg on 20 May 2015.

References

External links
Official website 

Croatian Football Cup seasons
Croatia
Croatian Cup, 2014-15